Synuchus coreanus is a species of ground beetle in the subfamily Harpalinae. It was described by Kinschenhofer in 1990.

References

Synuchus
Beetles described in 1990